Kohtla-Järve FC Lootus was an Estonian football club from Kohtla-Järve. The club was created in 1998 and dissolved in 2012, when they merged with Kohtla-Järve JK Alko, which resulted in creating a new club Kohtla-Järve JK Järve.

Kohtla-Järve in Estonian football

E/N – Eastern/Northern Zone

References

External links
Team page at Estonian Football Association

Football clubs in Estonia
Sport in Kohtla-Järve
Meistriliiga clubs